La Désirade is a commune in the French overseas region and department of Guadeloupe, in the Lesser Antilles.

The administrative centre of the commune is the settlement of Beauséjour on the island of La Désirade.

Education
Public preschools and primary schools include:
 Ecole primaire Beauséjour
 Ecole maternelle Baie-Mahault
 Ecole maternelle Louis Adrien Thionville

Public junior high schools include:
 Collège Maryse Condé

See also
La Désirade
Communes of the Guadeloupe department

References

Communes of Guadeloupe